= Pierre de l'Argentière =

Medieval French doctor and medical writer

Pierre de l'Argentière (fl. 1330s) was a Medieval French doctor and medical writer. He was master surgeon at Montpellier between 1333 and 1348.
